The Defence Communication Services Agency (DCSA) was an agency of the United Kingdom Ministry of Defence responsible for the procurement and delivery of Communications and Information Services (CIS) to the defence community and related public and private sector bodies.  The Agency was formed on 1 April 1998, bringing together a range of CIS organisations across all three services.

Formally a component of the Defence Logistics Organisation, the Agency brigaded together elements of the Defence Procurement Agency, the DLO and operational support elements within the three military Front Line Commands.

On 31 March 2007 the Agency was subsumed into Defence Equipment & Support, a new organisation bringing together the DPA and DLO, as the Information Systems & Services (ISS) cluster within that organisation.

Organisation

The DCSA was formed of a core headquarters, led by a military Chief Executive at Two-star rank, supported by an Operations Directorate, Directorate of Engineering and Interoperability, and a number of Integrated Project Teams, responsible for the procurement and support of systems and services.  The Agency was headquartered at Basil Hill Barracks, Corsham, Wiltshire, and had 5,000 staff at facilities in many locations in the UK and overseas.

DCSA Headquarters
Directorate of Operations
Customer Account Management - Basil Hill Barracks, Corsham
Global Operations and Security Control Centre - Basil Hill Barracks, Corsham
Defence High Frequency Service - Very Low, Low and High Frequency Radio Services - Headquartered at HMS Forest Moor and combining RN services with RAF services formerly headquartered at RAF Bampton Castle
Directorate of Engineering & Interoperability - Headquartered at RAF Henlow and bringing together RAF, RN and Army technical engineering services.

Integrated Project Teams

Network Layer
Defence Fixed Networks - Fixed and mobile telephony and core network services - Copenacre Site, Corsham
Satellite Communications - MoD Abbey Wood
HF Radio - MoD Abbey Wood

Presentation Layer
Defence Information Infrastructure - Desktop services - Copenacre Site, Corsham
Ground Based Air Defence - 
Air Command and Control

Application Layer
Corporate and Business Applications
Logistics Applications
Command, Control and Intelligence Systems
UK Cooperative Engagement Capability (naval air defence system)

Formation

The founding CE was Major-General Tony Raper CB CBE, late Royal Signals. He was succeeded by Rear Admiral Rees Ward in 2002, who continued as CE until 2007 when the Agency was disestablished.

References

External links
Defence Communications and Services Agency - Dead link
Cabinet Office reference

Corsham
Defence agencies of the United Kingdom
Defunct executive agencies of the United Kingdom government
History of telecommunications in the United Kingdom
Military communications of the United Kingdom
Organisations based in Wiltshire
Science and technology in Wiltshire